Marco Filipe Lopes Paixão (born 19 September 1984) is a Portuguese professional footballer who plays as a forward for Turkish club Altay.

Club career

Early career
Born in Sesimbra, Setúbal District, Paixão spent his early career in Portugal and Spain, playing with lowly teams in both countries – his hometown's G.D. Sesimbra, FC Porto B, CD Guijuelo, Logroñés CF and Cultural y Deportiva Leonesa.

In 2007–08, he suffered relegation from Segunda División B with Logroñés, and in the following season scored 13 goals for Leonesa.

Hamilton Academical
Paixão's first taste of professional football came in 2009 as he signed for Scottish Premier League club Hamilton Academical on 6 August, alongside twin brother Flávio. He made his league debut late in the month, against Aberdeen.

On 11 April 2011, it was announced that Paixão would leave at the end of the campaign. However, just three days later, he was released from his contract with immediate effect, alongside his sibling. He appeared in 56 official matches for the Accies, scoring six goals.

Naft Tehran
On 5 January 2012, Paixão joined his brother in Iran after signing with Naft Tehran F.C. until the end of the season. He made his debut in a 3–1 home loss against Foolad F.C. five days later, scoring his first goal in a 1–0 win over Malavan F.C. on 8 February.

Ethnikos and Poland
In the summer of 2012, Paixão joined Cypriot side Ethnikos Achna FC. He netted his first goal for his new club on 3 November, in a 1–1 draw at AEL Limassol.

In June 2013, Paixão signed a two-year contract with Śląsk Wrocław in Poland. He scored a career-best 21 goals in 2013–14, but his team could only qualify for the relegation play-offs.

In June 2015, Paixão put pen to paper to a two-year deal at AC Sparta Prague. The following January, after being barely used by the Czech club, he returned to the Ekstraklasa with Lechia Gdańsk after agreeing to a two-and-a-half-year contract; his twin joined him a month later.

Paixão concluded the 2016–17 season with hat-tricks in 4–0 home wins over Jagiellonia Białystok and Pogoń Szczecin. This brought his final tally to 18, joint with Lech Poznań's Marcin Robak as the top scorer.

In March 2018, Paixão was removed from the first team when manager Piotr Stokowiec accused him of feigning an injury, and when his contract expired in June, he moved to Altay S.K. in the TFF First League. He was top scorer in his first season with the İzmir-based team, netting 29 times in 33 games.

International career
During their spell in Poland, both Paixão and his sibling were repeatedly poised to be called up to the Portugal national team, but nothing came of it.

Personal life
Paixão's twin brother Flávio was also a footballer, Marco being the older by five minutes.

Career statistics

Honours
Individual
Ekstraklasa top scorer: 2016–17 (18 goals, joint with Marcin Robak)
TFF First League top scorer: 2018–19 (29 goals), 2019–20 (22 goals) 2020–21 (22 goals)

References

External links

1984 births
Living people
People from Sesimbra
Portuguese twins
Twin sportspeople
Sportspeople from Setúbal District
Portuguese footballers
Association football forwards
Segunda Divisão players
G.D. Sesimbra footballers
FC Porto B players
Segunda División B players
CD Guijuelo footballers
Logroñés CF footballers
Cultural Leonesa footballers
Scottish Premier League players
Hamilton Academical F.C. players
Persian Gulf Pro League players
Naft Tehran F.C. players
Cypriot First Division players
Ethnikos Achna FC players
Ekstraklasa players
Śląsk Wrocław players
Lechia Gdańsk players
Czech First League players
AC Sparta Prague players
Süper Lig players
TFF First League players
Altay S.K. footballers
Portuguese expatriate footballers
Expatriate footballers in Spain
Expatriate footballers in Scotland
Expatriate footballers in Iran
Expatriate footballers in Cyprus
Expatriate footballers in Poland
Expatriate footballers in the Czech Republic
Expatriate footballers in Turkey
Portuguese expatriate sportspeople in Spain
Portuguese expatriate sportspeople in Scotland
Portuguese expatriate sportspeople in Iran
Portuguese expatriate sportspeople in Cyprus
Portuguese expatriate sportspeople in Poland
Portuguese expatriate sportspeople in the Czech Republic
Portuguese expatriate sportspeople in Turkey